The 2009 All-Ireland Senior Ladies' Football Championship Final featured  and . Dublin made their first appearance in the final since 2004. Cork would win their fifth successive All-Ireland title. In a closely contested final, Cork scored four points in the final eight minutes to clinch the title by a single point.

Route to the Final

Match info

Teams

References

 
All-Ireland Senior Ladies' Football Championship Finals
Cork county ladies' football team matches
Dublin county ladies' football team matches
All-Ireland